Gardening Naturally is a TV show series hosted by Barbara Damrosch and Eliot Coleman.  It was created from 1993 to 1994 and ran until about 2003.  It first aired on TLC (The Learning Channel) and later reruns were shown on Discovery Home and Leisure.

Episode List

Episode Guide

Pruning Shrubs and Trees
Pruning techniques; reasons for pruning.
Plants that Heal
Herbalist; plants with healing properties; salves; teas.
Finding Fertilizers
Organic waste; enriching soil; compost bins; scavenger hunt.
Quest for Perfect Soil
Problem soil; Bruce Hoskins.
Trees in the Landscape
Choosing trees; Mount Auburn Cemetery; mature landscapes.
Indoor Plants
Developing healthy indoor plants.
Natural Landscaping Techniques
Natural looking landscape; landscaping mistakes; basics of design.
Creating a Balanced Environment
Balancing plants, insects and wildlife in your garden.
Unusual Vegetables
Indoor figs; artichokes; watercress.
Modifying Your Climate
Garden climate.
Gardening in the Shade
Plants suitable for shady areas; shade for a sunny garden.
Seeds and Seedlings
Seeding techniques; seeders; organic seeds.
Root Crops
Root crops; indoor forcing; crop rotation; companion planting.
Keeping Fit in the Garden
Physical benefits of gardening.
Annuals
Annuals; preparing a garden; germination; landscaping.
Building a Backyard Greenhouse
Greenhouse gardening; windbreak netting.
Self-Sufficiency
Year-round food production and storage; drying methods.
Day Lilies
Dramatic effects with day lilies; lily-petal salad.
Tomatoes
Growing tomatoes from seed; selection; transplanting; ripening.
Wildflowers
Landscaping with wildflowers.
The Wet Garden
Draining wet areas; raised gardens; water-loving plants.
Backyard Fruits
Backyard berries; apples, cherries and grapes; food; wines.
Propagation
Propagation; air-layering; suckers and root-cuttings.
Shrubs in the Landscape
Choosing shrubs; Boston's Arnold Arboretum; mature landscapes.
Roses
Hardy, old-fashioned roses; roses and garlic.
Ground Covers
Ground covers for problem areas.
Winter Harvesting
Fresh vegetables all winter.
How to Buy Plants
How to select and bed plants.
Starting Seeds Indoors
Making potting soil, soil blocks; indoor seedlings; common problems.
The Natural Perennial Garden
Choosing perennials for a natural effect; asparagus.
Fruit Trees
Fruit trees; optimum conditions; pruning.
Garden Structures
Trellis; cold-frame box; containers.
Gardening With Children
Projects for children.
Growing Herbs
Herb gardens; pots; harvesting, drying and freezing.
Attracting Wildlife
Attracting hummingbirds, lacewings, ladybugs; discouraging pests.
Small-Space Gardening
Container gardening; succession planting.
Irrigation
Irrigation; sprinklers; soakers; mulching; rain gauges.
Saving Your Own Seeds
Saving and storing seeds.
Tools
How to choose and care for tools.
Flowers for Drying
Dried flowers; arrangements; drying techniques.
Flowers for Cutting
Growing flowers in a vegetable garden; shovels and spades; country bouquet.
Extending the Season
Cold frames; plastic mulch; wind protection; greenhouses.
Putting in the Vegetables and Flower Garden
Sowing a fall cover-crop; rotting crops and compost heaps.
Harvest and Storage
Harvest tools; curing onions; root-crop storage.
Bulbs
Selecting bulbs; naturalizing.
Safe Lawn Care
Natural areas; ground covers; thatch; push lawn-mowers.
Help! There's A Raccoon in My Garden
Soap, electric fences and talk radio repel wildlife.
Controlling Insects and Diseases
Choosing insect- and disease-resistant plants; soil aeration.
Weeds and Weeding
Mulching; effective weeding; beneficial weeds.
Laying Out the Garden and Sowing the Seeds
The importance of crop spacing and garden layout.
How to Improve Your Soil
Soil improvement; compost; mulch; scythes.
Where Should We Put the Garden?
Surveying a yard; laying out the garden; tomatoes.

Cast, Producers, Location

Director
Series Directed by David Fuller

Series Cast
Eliot Coleman  Eliot Coleman   ...  Himself - Host 
Barbara Damrosch  Barbara Damrosch   ...  Herself - Host

Series Produced by
David Fuller   ... producer  
Jan Craige Singer   ... executive producer  
Series Cinematography by Philip Cormier    
Series Film Editing by Richard Cropley II

Location
Filming Locations: Harborside, Maine, USA

References

Gardening television